This is a list of the members of the Australian House of Representatives in the 15th Australian Parliament, which was elected at the 1937 election on 23 October 1937. The incumbent United Australia Party led by Prime Minister of Australia Joseph Lyons with coalition partner the Country Party led by Earle Page defeated the opposition Australian Labor Party led by John Curtin.  At the 1934 election nine seats in New South Wales were won by |  || . Following the reunion of the two Labor parties in February 1936, these were held by their members as Labor seats at the 1937 election. With the party's win in Ballaarat and Gwydir (initially at a by-election on 8 March 1937), the Labor had a net gain of 11 seats compared with the previous election.

Notes

References

Members of Australian parliaments by term
20th-century Australian politicians